The 2017–18 Miami Heat season was the 30th season of the franchise in the National Basketball Association (NBA).

On the February 8, 2018 NBA trade deadline, the Heat re-acquired star shooting guard Dwyane Wade from the Cleveland Cavaliers in exchange for a future second round draft pick, after losing him to free agency in July 2016.

Despite a loss to the Oklahoma City Thunder on April 9, 2018, the Heat clinched a playoff berth for the eighth time in ten seasons. Furthermore, they won their division on April 11 as a result of an overtime win over the Toronto Raptors, as well as a loss by the Washington Wizards to the Orlando Magic. The Heat finished the regular season with a 44–38 record, which clinched the 6th seed in the Eastern Conference playoffs. This made the Heat the lowest seeded playoff team to win a division championship since the NBA modified playoff seeding in 2016.

In the playoffs, they faced the 3rd seed Philadelphia 76ers in the first round and were defeated in 5 games.

It was the first NBA season without Chris Bosh since the 2002-03 season

Draft picks

Roster

Standings

Division

Conference

Game log

Preseason

|- style="background:#cfc;"
| 1
| October 1
| Atlanta
| 
| Tyler Johnson (14)
| Hassan Whiteside (15)
| Kelly Olynyk (5)
| American Airlines Arena19,600
| 1–0
|- style="background:#fbb;"
| 2
| October 5
| @ Brooklyn
| 
| Tyler Johnson (21)
| Hassan Whiteside (9)
| Josh Richardson (4)
| Barclays CenterN/A
| 1–1
|- style="background:#fbb;"
| 3
| October 7
| @ Orlando
| 
| Josh Richardson (19)
| Hassan Whiteside (15)
| Johnson, Olynyk, Richardson (4)
| Amway Center18,428
| 1–2
|- style="background:#cfc;"
| 4
| October 9
| Charlotte
| 
| Johnson, Richardson (18)
| Kelly Olynyk (12)
| Dion Waiters (8)
| American Airlines Arena19,600
| 2–2
|- style="background:#cfc;"
| 5
| October 11
| Washington
| 
| Bam Adebayo (15)
| Olynyk, Winslow (7)
| Justise Winslow (9)
| American Airlines Arena19,600
| 3–2
|- style="background:#fbb;"
| 6
| October 13
| @ Philadelphia
| 
| Adebayo, Johnson, Waiters (13)
| Jordan Mickey (10)
| Derrick Walton Jr. (6)
| Sprint Center11,249
| 3–3

Regular season

|- style="background:#fcc;"
| 1
| October 18
| @ Orlando
| 
| Hassan Whiteside (26)
| Hassan Whiteside (22)
| James Johnson (8)
| Amway Center18,846
| 0–1
|- style="background:#cfc;"
| 2
| October 21
| Indiana
| 
| Goran Dragic (23)
| Kelly Olynyk (9)
| James Johnson (8)
| AmericanAirlines Arena19,600
| 1–1
|- style="background:#cfc;"
| 3
| October 23
| Atlanta
| 
| Josh Richardson (21)
| Kelly Olynyk (10)
| Goran Dragic (6)
| AmericanAirlines Arena19,600
| 2–1
|- style="background:#fcc;"
| 4
| October 25
| San Antonio
| 
| Tyler Johnson (23)
| James Johnson (9)
| Dion Waiters (5)
| AmericanAirlines Arena19,600
| 2–2
|- style="background:#fcc"
| 5
| October 28
| Boston
| 
| Goran Dragic (22)
| Justise Winslow (12)
| Goran Dragic (4)
| American Airlines Arena19,600
| 2–3
|- style="background:#fcc"
| 6
| October 30
| Minnesota
| 
| Dion Waiters (33)
| Bam Adebayo (13)
| Goran Dragic (5)
| American Airlines Arena19,600
| 2–4

|- style="background:#cfc"
| 7
| November 1
| Chicago
| 
| Goran Dragic (20)
| Hassan Whiteside (14)
| Dion Waiters (7)
| American Airlines Arena19,600
| 3–4
|- style="background:#fcc"
| 8
| November 3
| @ Denver
| 
| Goran Dragic (23)
| James Johnson (10)
| Goran Dragic (7)
| Pepsi Center15,317
| 3–5
|- style="background:#cfc"
| 9
| November 5
| @ LA Clippers
| 
| Hassan Whiteside (21)
| Hassan Whiteside (17)
| Goran Dragic (6)
| Staples Center15,676
| 4–5
|- style="background:#fcc"
| 10
| November 6
| @ Golden State
| 
| James Johnson (21)
| James Johnson (9)
| James Johnson (6)
| Oracle Arena19,596
| 4–6
|- style="background:#cfc"
| 11
| November 8
| @ Phoenix
| 
| Goran Dragic (29)
| Hassan Whiteside (10)
| Johnson, Winslow (5)
| Talking Stick Resort Arena16,500
| 5–6
|- style="background:#cfc"
| 12
| November 10
| @ Utah
| 
| Dion Waiters (21)
| Hassan Whiteside (20)
| Goran Dragic (3)
| Vivint Smart Home Arena18,306
| 6–6
|- style="background:#fcc"
| 13
| November 12
| @ Detroit
| 
| Hassan Whiteside (20)
| Hassan Whiteside (12)
| Goran Dragic (7)
| Little Caesars Arena16,236
| 6–7
|- style="background:#fcc"
| 14
| November 15
| Washington
| 
| Goran Dragic (21)
| Hassan Whiteside (21)
| Dion Waiters (5)
| American Airlines Arena19,600
| 6–8
|- style="background:#cfc"
| 15
| November 17
| @ Washington
| 
| Hassan Whiteside (22)
| Hassan Whiteside (16)
| Goran Dragic (7)
| Capital One Arena17,551
| 7–8
|- style="background:#fcc"
| 16
| November 19
| Indiana
| 
| Wayne Ellington (21)
| Hassan Whiteside (8)
| James Johnson (6)
| American Airlines Arena19,600
| 7–9
|- style="background:#cfc"
| 17
| November 22
| Boston
| 
| Goran Dragic (27)
| Hassan Whiteside (10)
| Dion Waiters (6)
| American Airlines Arena19,704
| 8–9
|- style="background:#cfc"
| 18
| November 24
| @ Minnesota
| 
| Wayne Ellington (21)
| Hassan Whiteside (10)
| James Johnson (8)
| Target Center18,978
| 9–9
|- style="background:#cfc"
| 19
| November 26
| @ Chicago
| 
| Goran Dragic (24)
| Hassan Whiteside (9)
| James Johnson (6)
| United Center20,928
| 10–9
|- style="background:#fcc"
| 20
| November 28
| @ Cleveland
| 
| Dion Waiters (21)
| Tyler Johnson (20)
| Dion Waiters (7)
| Quicken Loans Arena20,562
| 10–10
|- style="background:#fcc"
| 21
| November 29
| @ NY Knicks
| 
| Kelly Olynyk (18)
| Adebayo, Olynyk, Winslow (5)
| Dion Waiters (8)
| Madison Square Garden17,693
| 10–11

|- style="background:#cfc"
| 22
| December 1
| Charlotte
| 
| Josh Richardson (27)
| Justise Winslow (11)
| Kelly Olynyk (6)
| American Airlines Arena19,600
| 11–11
|- style="background:#fcc"
| 23
| December 3
| Golden State
| 
| Goran Dragic (24)
| Kelly Olynyk (7)
| Kelly Olynyk (5)
| American Airlines Arena19,600
| 11–12
|- style="background:#fcc"
| 24
| December 6
| @ San Antonio
| 
| Dion Waiters (22)
| Kelly Olynyk (8)
| Goran Dragic (6)
| AT&T Center18,252
| 11–13
|- style="background:#cfc"
| 25
| December 9
| @ Brooklyn
| 
| Goran Dragic (20)
| Dragic, Johnson (7)
| Dragic, Johnson, Olynyk (3)
| Mexico City Arena19,777
| 12–13
|- style="background:#cfc"
| 26
| December 11
| @ Memphis
| 
| Goran Dragic (19)
| Dragic, Johnson, Richardson, Winslow (5)
| Goran Dragic (5)
| FedEx Forum14,857
| 13–13
|- style="background:#fcc"
| 27
| December 13
| Portland
| 
| Wayne Ellington (24)
| James Johnson (10)
| James Johnson (8)
| AmericanAirlines Arena19,600
| 13–14
|- style="background:#cfc;"
| 28
| December 15
| @ Charlotte
| 
| Ellington, Johnson (16)
| Jordan Mickey (7)
| Goran Dragic (7)
| Spectrum Center15,565
| 14–14
|- style="background:#cfc"
| 29
| December 16
| LA Cilppers
| 
| Josh Richardson (28)
| Johnson, Dion Waiters (6)
| Kelly Olynyk (4)
| AmericanAirlines Arena19,600
| 15–14
|- style="background:#fcc;"
| 30
| December 18
| @ Atlanta
| 
| Josh Richardson (26)
| Adebayo, Mickey (10)
| Olynyk, Dion Waiters (5)
| Philips Arena14,227
| 15–15
|- style="background:#cfc"
| 31
| December 20
| @ Boston
| 
| Kelly Olynyk (32)
| Tyler Johnson (11)
| Richardson, Dion Waiters (6)
| TD Garden18,624
| 16–15
|- style="background:#cfc"
| 32
| December 22
| Dallas
| 
| Josh Richardson (24)
| Bam Adebayo (8)
| Adebayo, Richardson, Walton Jr. (5)
| AmericanAirlines Arena19,600
| 17–15
|- style="background:#fcc"
| 33
| December 23
| New Orleans
| 
| Tyler Johnson (20)
| Kelly Olynyk (8)
| Matt Willams (4)
| AmericanAirlines Arena19,600
| 17–16
|- style="background:#cfc"
| 34
| December 26
| Orlando
| 
| Josh Richardson (20)
| Kelly Olynyk (12)
| Goran Dragic (6)
| AmericanAirlines Arena19,600
| 18–16
|- style="background:#fcc"
| 35
| December 29
| Brooklyn
| 
| Josh Richardson (19)
| Jordan Mickey (9)
| Goran Dragic (5)
| AmericanAirlines Arena19,600
| 18–17
|- style="background:#cfc"
| 36
| December 30
| @ Orlando
| 
| Tyler Johnson (31)
| Hassan Whiteside (13)
| Goran Dragic (8)
| Amway Center18,846
| 19–17

|- style="background:#cfc"
| 37
| January 3
| Detroit
| 
| Kelly Olynyk (25)
| Kelly Olynyk (13)
| Goran Dragic (13)
| American Airlines Arena19,600
| 20–17
|- style="background:#cfc"
| 38
| January 5
| NY Knicks
| 
| Wayne Ellington (24)
| Kelly Olynyk (10)
| Dragic, Johnson (6)
| American Airlines Arena19,600
| 21–17
|- style="background:#cfc"
| 39
| January 7
| Utah
| 
| Dragic, Johnson (16)
| Hassan Whiteside (10)
| Josh Richardson (7)
| American Airlines Arena19,600
| 22–17
|- style="background:#cfc"
| 40
| January 9
| @ Toronto
| 
| Goran Dragic (24)
| Adebayo, Whiteside (15)
| Dragic, Richardson (4)
| Air Canada Centre19,800
| 23–17
|- style="background:#cfc"
| 41
| January 10
| @ Indiana
| 
| Goran Dragic (20)
| Hassan Whiteside (15)
| Goran Dragic (9)
| Bankers Life Fieldhouse14,540
| 24–17
|- style="background:#cfc"
| 42
| January 14
|  Milwaukee
| 
| Goran Dragic (25)
| Hassan Whiteside (10)
| James Johnson (8)
| American Airlines Arena19,600
| 25–17
|- style="background:#fcc"
| 43
| January 15
| @ Chicago
| 
| Goran Dragic (22)
| Hassan Whiteside (8)
| Goran Dragic (9)
| United Center20,546
| 25–18
|- style="background:#cfc"
| 44
| January 17
| @ Milwaukee
| 
| Hassan Whiteside (27)
| Hassan Whiteside (13)
| James Johnson (6)
| BMO Harris Bradley Center16,695
| 26–18
|- style="background:#fcc"
| 45
| January 19
| @ Brooklyn
| 
| Hassan Whiteside (22)
| Hassan Whiteside (13)
| Josh Richardson (7)
| Barclays Center17,732
| 26–19
|- style="background:#cfc"
| 46
| January 20
| @ Charlotte
| 
| Wayne Ellington (26)
| Hassan Whiteside (14)
| James Johnson (7)
| Spectrum Center18,687
| 27–19
|- style="background:#fcc"
| 47
| January 22
| @ Houston
| 
| Hassan Whiteside (22)
| Hassan Whiteside (13)
| Johnson, Winslow (4)
| Toyota Center18,055
| 27–20
|- style="background:#fcc"
| 48
| January 25
| Sacramento
| 
| Goran Dragic (23)
| Hassan Whiteside (13)
| Josh Richardson (5)
| American Airlines Arena19,600
| 27–21
|- style="background:#cfc"
| 49
| January 27
| Charlotte
| 
| Josh Richardson (19)
| Whiteside, Johnson (10)
| Kelly Olynyk (6)
| American Airlines Arena19,600
| 28–21
|- style="background:#cfc"
| 50
| January 29
| @ Dallas
| 
| Hassan Whiteside (25)
| Hassan Whiteside (14)
| James Johnson (6)
| American Airlines Center19,555
| 29–21
|- style="background:#fcc"
| 51
| January 31
| @ Cleveland
| 
| Goran Dragic (18)
| Justise Winslow (10)
| Goran Dragic (6)
| Quicken Loans Arena20,562
| 29–22

|- style="background:#fcc"
| 52
| February 2
| @ Philadelphia
| 
| Kelly Olynyk (19)
| Bam Adebayo (13)
| Bam Adebayo (6)
| Wells Fargo Center20,636
| 29–23
|- style="background:#fcc"
| 53
| February 3
| @ Detroit
| 
| Goran Dragic (33)
| Kelly Olynyk (8)
| James Johnson (7)
| Little Caesars Arena18,747
| 29–24
|- style="background:#fcc"
| 54
| February 5
| Orlando
| 
| Josh Richardson (20)
| Hassan Whiteside (14)
| Goran Dragic (7)
| American Airlines Arena19,600
| 29–25
|- style="background:#fcc"
| 55
| February 7
| Houston
| 
| Dragic, Richardson (30)
| Hassan Whiteside (17)
| Goran Dragic (6)
| American Airlines Arena19,600
| 29–26
|- style="background:#cfc"
| 56
| February 9
| Milwaukee
| 
| Tyler Johnson (19)
| Hassan Whiteside (16)
| Adebayo, Dragic, Johnson (3)
| American Airlines Arena20,018
| 30–26
|- style="background:#fcc"
| 57
| February 13
| @ Toronto
| 
| Goran Dragic (28)
| Hassan Whiteside (10)
| Dwyane Wade (6)
| Air Canada Centre19,800
| 30–27
|- style="background:#fcc"
| 58
| February 14
| @ Philadelphia
| 
| James Johnson (7)
| Hassan Whiteside (10)
| Tyler Johnson (6)
| Wells Fargo Center20,492
| 30–28
|- style="background:#fcc"
| 59
| February 23
| @ New Orleans
| 
| Goran Dragic (30)
| Hassan Whiteside (16)
| Goran Dragic (8)
| Smoothie King Center17,751
| 30–29
|- style="background:#cfc"
| 60
| February 24
| Memphis
| 
| Tyler Johnson (23)
| Hassan Whiteside (8)
| Goran Dragic (8)
| American Airlines Arena19,600
| 31–29
|- style="background:#cfc"
| 61
| February 27
| Philadelphia
| 
| Dwyane Wade (27)
| Hassan Whiteside (11)
| Goran Dragić (5)
| American Airlines Arena19,600
| 32–29

|- style="background:#fcc"
| 62
| March 1
| LA Lakers
| 
| Dwyane Wade (25)
| Hassan Whiteside (7)
| Goran Dragić (7)
| American Airlines Arena19,600
| 32–30
|- style="background:#cfc"
| 63
| March 3
| Detroit
| 
| Richardson, Olynyk (17)
| Hassan Whiteside (19)
| Goran Dragić (5)
| American Airlines Arena19,600
| 33–30
|- style="background:#cfc"
| 64
| March 5
| Phoenix
| 
| Hassan Whiteside (24)
| Hassan Whiteside (14)
| Kelly Olynyk (8)
| American Airlines Arena19,600
| 34–30
|- style="background:#fcc"
| 65
| March 6
| @ Washington
| 
| Dwyane Wade (22)
| Kelly Olynyk (9)
| Dwyane Wade (6)
| Capital One Arena16,582
| 34–31
|- style="background:#cfc"
| 66
| March 8
| Philadelphia
| 
| Hassan Whiteside (26)
| Hassan Whiteside (8)
| Goran Dragić (7)
| American Airlines Arena19,600
| 35–31
|- style="background:#cfc"
| 67
| March 10
| Washington
| 
| James Johnson (20)
| Kelly Olynyk (11)
| James Johnson (5)
| American Airlines Arena19,689
| 36–31
|- style="background:#fcc"
| 68
| March 12
| @ Portland
| 
| Goran Dragić (23)
| Justise Winslow (13)
| Kelly Olynyk (7)
| Moda Center19,786
| 36–32
|- style="background:#fcc"
| 69
| March 14
| @ Sacramento
| 
| Goran Dragić (33)
| Bam Adebayo (16)
| James Johnson (7)
| Golden 1 Center17,583
| 36–33
|- style="background:#cfc"
| 70
| March 16
| @ LA Lakers
| 
| Goran Dragić (30)
| Adebayo, Richardson (8)
| James Johnson (4)
| Staples Center18,997
| 37–33
|- style="background:#cfc"
| 71
| March 19
| Denver
| 
| James Johnson (31)
| James Johnson (11)
| Goran Dragić (8)
| American Airlines Arena19,600
| 38–33
|- style="background:#cfc"
| 72
| March 21
| New York
| 
| Tyler Johnson (22)
| Johnson, Olynyk (5)
| Kelly Olynyk (10)
| American Airlines Arena19,600
| 39–33
|- style="background:#fcc"
| 73
| March 23
| @ Oklahoma City
| 
| James Johnson (23)
| Bam Adebayo (7)
| Dragić, Richardson (5)
| Chesapeake Energy Arena18,203
| 39–34
|- style="background:#fcc"
| 74
| March 25
| @ Indiana
| 
| Tyler Johnson (19)
| Johnson, Olynyk (9)
| Dwyane Wade (7)
| Bankers Life Fieldhouse17,923
| 39–35
|- style="background:#cfc"
| 75
| March 27
| Cleveland
| 
| Kelly Olynyk (19)
| Justise Winslow (9)
| Dragić, Johnson (5)
| American Airlines Arena20,093
| 40–35
|- style="background:#cfc"
| 76
| March 29
| Chicago
| 
| Josh Richardson (22)
| Justise Winslow (9)
| Goran Dragić (5)
| American Airlines Arena19,746
| 41–35
|- style="background:#fcc"
| 77
| March 31
| Brooklyn
| 
| Dragić, Johnson (18)
| Dragić, Olynyk (8)
| James Johnson (5)
| American Airlines Arena19,600
| 41–36

|- style="background:#cfc"
| 78
| April 3
| Atlanta
| 
| Goran Dragić (22)
| Hassan Whiteside (12)
| James Johnson (6)
| American Airlines Arena19,600
| 42–36
|- style="background:#cfc"
| 79
| April 4
| @ Atlanta
| 
| Josh Richardson (19)
| Hassan Whiteside (13)
| Olynyk, Winslow (5)
| Philips Arena 16,696
| 43–36
|- style="background:#fcc"
| 80
| April 6
| @ NY Knicks
| 
| Goran Dragić (15)
| Hassan Whiteside (6)
| Johnson, McGruder (4)
| Madison Square Garden19,569
| 43–37
|- style="background:#fcc"
| 81
| April 9
| Oklahoma City
| 
| Josh Richardson (18)
| Justise Winslow (9)
| Goran Dragić (7)
| American Airlines Arena19,600
| 43–38
|- style="background:#cfc"
| 82
| April 11
| Toronto
| 
| Wayne Ellington (32)
| Hassan Whiteside (12)
| Josh Richardson (5)
| American Airlines Arena19,600
| 44–38

Playoffs

|- style="background:#fcc;"
| 1
| April 14
| @ Philadelphia
| 
| Kelly Olynyk (26)
| Olynyk, Winslow (7)
| Justise Winslow (5)
| Wells Fargo Center20,617
| 0–1
|- style="background:#cfc;"
| 2
| April 16
| @ Philadelphia
| 
| Dwyane Wade (28)
| Johnson, Wade (7)
| Kelly Olynyk (6)
| Wells Fargo Center20,753
| 1–1
|- style="background:#fcc;"
| 3
| April 19
| Philadelphia
| 
| Goran Dragic (23)
| Justise Winslow (10)
| Goran Dragic (8)
| American Airlines Arena19,812
| 1–2
|- style="background:#fcc;"
| 4
| April 21
| Philadelphia
| 
| Dwyane Wade (25)
| Hassan Whiteside (13)
| Josh Richardson (7)
| American Airlines Arena19,804
| 1–3
|- style="background:#fcc;"
| 5
| April 24
| @ Philadelphia
| 
| Kelly Olynyk (18)
| Kelly Olynyk (8)
| Kelly Olynyk (7)
| Wells Fargo Center21,171
| 1–4

Transactions

Trades

Free agents

Re-signed

Additions

Subtractions

References

Miami Heat seasons
Miami Heat
Miami Heat
Miami Heat